In mathematics, a Delannoy number  describes the number of paths from the southwest corner (0, 0) of a rectangular grid to the northeast corner (m, n), using only single steps north, northeast, or east. The Delannoy numbers are named after French army officer and amateur mathematician Henri Delannoy.

Example
The Delannoy number D(3,3) equals 63. The following figure illustrates the 63 Delannoy paths from (0, 0) to (3, 3):

The subset of paths that do not rise above the SW–NE diagonal are counted by a related family of numbers, the Schröder numbers.

Delannoy array
The Delannoy array is an infinite matrix of the Delannoy numbers:

{| class="wikitable" style="text-align:right;"
|-
! 
! width="50" | 0
! width="50" | 1
! width="50" | 2
! width="50" | 3
! width="50" | 4
! width="50" | 5
! width="50" | 6
! width="50" | 7
! width="50" | 8
|-
! 0
| 1 || 1 || 1 || 1 || 1 || 1 || 1 || 1 || 1
|-
! 1
| 1 || 3 || 5 || 7 || 9 || 11 || 13 || 15 || 17
|-
! 2
| 1 || 5 || 13 || 25 || 41 || 61 || 85 || 113 || 145
|-
! 3
| 1 || 7 || 25 || 63 || 129 || 231 || 377 || 575 || 833
|-
! 4
| 1 || 9 || 41 || 129 || 321 || 681 || 1289 || 2241 || 3649
|-
! 5
| 1 || 11 || 61 || 231 || 681 || 1683 || 3653 || 7183 || 13073
|-
! 6
| 1 || 13 || 85 || 377 || 1289 || 3653 || 8989 || 19825 || 40081
|-
! 7
| 1 || 15 || 113 || 575 || 2241 || 7183 || 19825 || 48639 || 108545
|-
! 8
| 1 || 17 || 145 || 833 || 3649 || 13073 || 40081 || 108545 || 265729
|-
! 9
| 1 || 19 || 181 || 1159 || 5641 || 22363 || 75517 || 224143 || 598417
|}

In this array, the numbers in the first row are all one, the numbers in the second row are the odd numbers, the numbers in the third row are the centered square numbers, and the numbers in the fourth row are the centered octahedral numbers. Alternatively, the same numbers can be arranged in a triangular array resembling Pascal's triangle, also called the tribonacci triangle, in which each number is the sum of the three numbers above it:

             1
           1   1
         1   3   1
       1   5   5   1
     1   7  13   7   1
   1   9  25  25   9   1
 1  11  41  63  41  11   1

Central Delannoy numbers
The central Delannoy numbers D(n) = D(n,n) are the numbers for a square n × n grid.  The first few central Delannoy numbers (starting with n=0) are:

1, 3, 13, 63, 321, 1683, 8989, 48639, 265729, ... .

Computation

Delannoy numbers
For  diagonal (i.e. northeast) steps, there must be  steps in the  direction and  steps in the  direction in order to reach the point ; as these steps can be performed in any order, the number of such paths is given by the multinomial coefficient
. Hence, one gets the closed-form expression

An alternative expression is given by

or by the infinite series

And also

The basic recurrence relation for the Delannoy numbers is easily seen to be

This recurrence relation also leads directly to the generating function

Central Delannoy numbers
Substituting  in the first closed form expression above, replacing , and a little algebra, gives

while the second expression above yields

The central Delannoy numbers satisfy also a three-term recurrence relationship among themselves,

and have a generating function

The leading asymptotic behavior of the central Delannoy numbers is given by

where 

and 
.

See also
Motzkin number
Narayana number

References

External links

Integer sequences
Triangles of numbers
Combinatorics